The 2010 1. divisjon (referred to as Adeccoligaen for sponsorship reasons) was a Norwegian second-tier football season. The season began play on 5 April 2010 and ended on 7 November 2010.

The clubs relegated from the Tippeligaen in 2009 were Fredrikstad (after relegation play-offs), Bodø/Glimt and Lyn. HamKam, Notodden, Stavanger and Skeid were relegated to the 2. divisjon in 2009 after finishing from thirteenth to sixteenth place respectively. Strømmen, Follo, Sandnes Ulf and Ranheim were promoted from the 2. divisjon in 2009.

At the end of the season, a two-legged promotion playoff was played between the 3rd, 4th, and 5th placed teams in the 1. divisjon and the 14th placed team in the Tippeligaen, Fredrikstad won this playoff against Hønefoss, and was promoted together with Sogndal and Sarpsborg 08.

FK Lyn elected to file for bankruptcy on 30 June, following an extended period of financial distress, and formally withdrew from the league on 7 July. Pursuant to the rules and regulations of the competition, all games involving Lyn was annulled and the team placed at the bottom of the standings.

Follo did not finish their licensing application for the 2011 season before the time limit of September 15, and were thus relegated at the end of the season even though they finished outside the relegation zone. As a result of this, Sandnes Ulf, which was the best placed team of those inside the relegation zone, avoided relegation. Tromsdalen and Moss were the remaining two teams relegated to the 2011 2. divisjon.

Overview

League table

Results

Promotion play-offs

The third-placed team in 1. divisjon, Fredrikstad, took part in a two-legged play-off against the 14th-placed team in Tippeligaen, Hønefoss.

First leg

Second leg

Fredrikstad won 8–1 on aggregate and were promoted to the 2011 Tippeligaen; Hønefoss were relegated to the 1. divisjon.

Top goalscorers

Source: NRK Sport

See also
 2010 in Norwegian football
 2010 Tippeligaen

References

Norwegian First Division seasons
2
Norway
Norway